The 2013 season was Malmö FF's 102nd in existence, their 78th season in Allsvenskan and their 13th consecutive season in the league. They competed in Allsvenskan where they finished first, 2012–13 Svenska Cupen where they were knocked out in the group stage, Svenska Supercupen where they won the competition against IFK Göteborg and the 2013–14 UEFA Europa League where they were knocked out in the third qualifying round. Malmö FF also participated in one competition in which the club continued playing in for the 2014 season, 2013–14 Svenska Cupen. The season began with the group stage of Svenska Cupen in March, league play started in April and lasted until November, Svenska Supercupen was the last competitive match of the season.

A new captain was announced since former captain Ulrich Vinzents left the squad as well as former vice captain and previous captain Daniel Andersson who announced his retirement from professional football in November 2012. Third captain Jiloan Hamad took over the captaincy. The club won their 17th Swedish championship title and 20th Allsvenskan title on 28 October 2013 when they defeated reigning champions IF Elfsborg in an away fixture at Borås Arena in the penultimate round of the league.

Summary

Allsvenskan
The league season started in late March 2013 and ended in early November 2013. The official season fixtures were released on 14 December 2012. Malmö FF started the season with a home fixture against newcomers Halmstads BK on 1 April which ended in a 1–1 draw. There was no longer break in the match schedule even though Sweden hosted the UEFA Women's Euro 2013 between 10 and 28 July, although there was shorter breaks due to international fixtures. Malmö FF ended the season at home against Syrianska FC with a 3–1 win on 3 November.

After the draw in the opening game the club won four games in a row against Åtvidabergs FF, Kalmar FF, AIK and Östers IF, two of which were at home and two which were away games. This resulted in Malmö FF positioning themselves second in the league table after IFK Göteborg with the same number of points albeit with a lesser goal difference. The next match after the four win streak was the away game against IFK Göteborg. This match ended 1–1 after Göteborg scored the equalizer in the last minute of the game. A 1–1 draw in the next home game against IFK Norrköping still kept the club at second place in the table, although their first loss of the season in the next game, the away fixture against Djurgårdens IF, saw Malmö FF drop to a fifth place in the league table. The win-less streak continued in the next two games. Malmö FF drew 2–2 in the away game against Mjällby AIF, thus continuing Malmö FF's difficult history at Strandvallen, Malmö FF have never won an away fixture against Mjällby at Strandvallen in eight tries since 1980. For the 10th round Malmö FF faced Helsingborgs IF in the Scanian derby at home. The match was attended by a season best of 23,730 spectators and resulted in a 1–1 draw. With a third of the league matches played Malmö FF had gathered 17 points and positioned themselves fourth in the league table after leaders Helsingborg, IFK Göteborg and last years winners IF Elfsborg.

Malmö FF then won three games in a row, two away games against IF Brommapojkarna and Syrianska FC as well as the home game against top rivals Elfsborg. Despite this, the club remained in 4th position. This was followed by a rare home defeat against last years runners up BK Häcken with 3–1. This was followed up by two home wins which saw Malmö FF advance up to second place in the league table behind Helsingborg. In the middle of European play in the UEFA Europa League the club lost the following away fixture against fellow European qualifying contender Gefle IF. This match was once again followed by a string of wins leading up to the 20th round of matches. On 11 August the club beat fellow title contender AIK 1–0 in Malmö in a match that meant that Malmö FF went three points ahead of AIK and with the same number of points as leaders Helsingborg. Malmö FF secured pole position in the table in the following fixture when they beat Kalmar FF at Guldfågeln Arena on 18 August with 4–1, Kalmar's first home defeat of the season. With only ten matches left of the season Malmö FF was in the lead with 41 points. Helsinborg, IFK Göteborg and AIK trailed the club with 38 points respectively.

The next fixture was Malmö FF vs IFK Göteborg at Swedbank Stadion which Malmö FF won 3–1 after having been down 0–1 after 17 minutes of play. This fixture established Malmö FF as the top contender for the title. Next followed a 1–1 draw in the away fixture against Östers IF before a two-week international break. Malmö FF followed up the break by losing at home against Djurgårdens IF who they had previously lost against in the away fixture earlier in the season. Nevertheless, of this streak of two win-less matches Malmö FF stayed at the top of the table. The club went on to win three consecutive fixtures in which the away match against Helsingborgs IF was crucial as this put Malmö FF six points ahead of their rivals and kept the gap down to IFK Göteborg who was now their primary title contender. The club then later had the opportunity to increase their lead to seven points in the away fixture against BK Häcken as IFK Göteborg had lost their match against Djurgårdens IF just moments before the start of the game at Rambergsvallen. However this failed as Häcken took their second win of the season against Malmö FF.

Nevertheless, Malmö FF still had the opportunity to win the title if they could win two of the remaining three fixtures. In the next fixture at home against IF Bromapojkarna the away side equalized Malmö FF's early lead and held the club to a draw until the 86th minute when Guillermo Molins scored the winning goal, Molins had also scored the first goal of the game. This meant that the club had the opportunity to clinch the league title with a win in the away fixture against IF Elfsborg at Borås Arena in Borås on 28 October. Up until the final hours prior to the match it was uncertain if the match could be played due to weather conditions caused by the St Jude storm that affected the whole of south-west Sweden at the time. However the match official deemed that the match could go ahead and 4,000 to 5,000 Malmö FF who had travelled the 30 miles from Malmö were let into the stands. The match was eventually won 2–0 by Malmö FF after two goals from Molins yet again. This meant that the club had won its 20th Allsvenskan title and 17th Swedish championship title. This was the first time the club had secured a Swedish championship in an away fixture since the 1977 season, that time also in Borås at Ryavallen. The last match of the season was the home fixture against Syrianska FC on 3 November. Malmö FF quickly opened the scoring with three goals in the game's first 19 minutes. Syrianska eventually reduced the lead to 3–1 which was the game's final result. 23,758 people attended the game at Swedbank Stadion, this season's best attendance ahead of the home fixture against Helsingborg. Daniel Andersson was substituted into play in the 84th minute of play to celebrate the end of his playing career. After the match the team was awarded Lennart Johanssons Pokal by previous UEFA and Swedish Football Association president himself, Lennart Johansson.

Svenska Cupen
Malmö FF qualified for the group stage of the 2012–13 Svenska Cupen in the 2012 season by beating Sandvikens IF after extra time in round 2 in August 2012. The club was later seeded third in the group stage draw after finishing third in the 2012 Allsvenskan. The groups were drawn in November 2012 and Malmö FF were drawn against newly relegated GIF Sundsvall, newly promoted Östers IF and Division 1 club IK Frej. The group stage was played in early March 2013 before the start of the league season.

Malmö FF played their first cup match of the new year against Östers IF on 2 March 2013 at Malmö Stadion, the match finished in a draw 1–1. The second fixture was played against IK Frej who had beaten GIF Sundsvall 2–1 in the previous home fixture. The match which ended 2–0 in Malmö FF's favour was played on 10 March 2013 at Skytteholms IP in Solna. Östers IF had played their last group fixture against IK Frej three days prior to Malmö FF's last fixture, that match ended 5–0 for Östers IF. This meant that Malmö FF were forced to win their match against GIF Sundsvall with at least five goals to progress to the quarter-finals on superior goal difference. The match against GIF Sundsvall was played at Limhamns IP in Malmö and ended 4–1 to Malmö FF. This meant that the club finished second in the group, and therefore missed advancement to the quarter-finals, with seven points, this was as many points as Östers IF but with a lesser goal difference of +5 in comparison to Östers IF's +7.

Malmö FF entered the new cup season in the second round which was played on 21 August 2013. The club was drawn against Division 2 side Sävedalens IF and the match was played away in Partille. Malmö FF won 6–0 and progressed to the group stage which was played in March 2014.

Svenska Supercupen
Malmö FF qualified for the 2013 Svenska Supercupen by winning the 2013 Allsvenskan on 28 October 2013. The match was played at home at Swedbank Stadion on 10 November 2013 and the club's opponents was 2012–13 Svenska Cupen winners IFK Göteborg. This was the second time that the club competed in Svenska Supercupen and it was the club's second attempt to win the competition after having failed the first time in 2011 against Helsingborgs IF. The match ended in a 3–2 win for Malmö FF after Emil Forsberg scored two goals and Guillermo Molins scored the third and winning goal in injury time.

UEFA Europa League
Malmö FF qualified for the 2013–14 UEFA Europa League by merit of finishing third in the 2012 Allsvenskan. The club entered the competition in the first round of qualification. The draws for the first and second qualifying rounds were held on 24 June 2013, Malmö FF was seeded in both the draw for the first qualifying round and the second qualifying round. Malmö FF were drawn against Irish club Drogheda United in the first qualifying round. The first leg in Dublin on 4 July ended 0–0 and the second leg on 11 July in Malmö ended with a 2–0 victory for Malmö FF, this resulted in a 2–0 aggregate score for Malmö FF to take the club through to the second qualifying round. Malmö FF played Scottish club Hibernian F.C. in the second qualifying round on 18 and 25 July. The first match at home was won 2–0 and the match in Edinburgh ended in a decisive 7–0 victory for Malmö FF to win with a 9–0 aggregate score. Malmö FF were not seeded in the draw for the third qualifying round which resulted in the winner of Malmö FF and Hibernian facing Swansea City from the English Premier League. The first leg of the match was played in Swansea on 1 August and ended in a 4–0 victory for the home side. The second leg played in Malmö on 8 August ended in a goalless draw which confirmed the aggregate score to 4–0 in favour of Swansea City.

Key events
 25 October 2012: Forward Petter Thelin joins the club on a three-year contract, transferring from Kramfors-Alliansen.
 1 November 2012: Defender Ulrich Vinzents leaves the club on free transfer.
 5 November 2012: Midfielder Wílton Figueiredo leaves the club on free transfer.
 7 November 2012: Forward Daniel Larsson leaves the club, transferring to Real Valladolid.
 13 November 2012: Goalkeeper Zlatan Azinović leaves the club on free transfer.
 16 November 2012: Defender Daniel Andersson announces the end of his professional playing career.
 23 November 2012: Goalkeeper Sixten Mohlin, midfielder Pawel Cibicki and defenders Alexander Blomqvist and Pa Konate are all promoted to the first team squad on a youth contract basis.
 30 November 2012: Midfielder Petar Petrović is promoted to the first team squad on a youth contract basis.
 3 December 2012: Midfielder Markus Halsti signs a new two-year contract, keeping him at the club until the end of the 2014 season.
 10 December 2012: Midfielder Emil Forsberg joins the club on a four-year contract, transferring from GIF Sundsvall.
 12 December 2012: Defender Erik Johansson joins the club on a four-year contract, transferring from GAIS.
 19 December 2012: Forward Alexander Nilsson and defender Tobias Malm leaves the club on loan to Landskrona BoIS for the duration of the season.
 20 December 2012: Forward Benjamin Fadi joins the club on a four-year contract, transferring from Heart of Lions.
 14 January 2013: Defender Jasmin Sudić leaves the club on loan to Mjällby AIF for the duration of the season.
 21 January 2013: Forward Magnus Eriksson joins the club on a four-year contract, transferring from Gent.
 22 February 2013: Defender Filip Stenström leaves the club on loan to Ängelholms FF for the duration of the season.
 28 March 2013: Midfielder Simon Kroon signs a new three-year contract, his first contract for the first team, keeping him at the club until the end of the 2015 season.
 29 March 2013: Midfielder Amin Nazari leaves the club on loan to Assyriska FF for the duration of the season. At the same time he signs a new three-year contract, keeping him at the club until the end of the 2015 season.
 2 April 2013: Forward Petter Thelin leaves the club on loan to IF Limhamn Bunkeflo for the duration of the season.
 23 April 2013: Forward Tokelo Rantie joins the club on a permanent basis, signing a four-year contract to keep him at the club until the end of the 2016 season.
 17 June 2013: Midfielder Erdal Rakip is promoted to the first team squad on a youth contract basis, signing a two and a half year contract to keep him at the club until the end of the 2015 season.
 18 June 2013: Defender Johan Hammar joins the club on a six months contract, transferring from Everton.
 1 August 2013: Defender Filip Stenström leaves the club, transferring to Ängelholms FF.
 11 August 2013: Midfielder Guillermo Molins joins the club on a three-year contract, transferring from Anderlecht.
 28 August 2013: Forward Tokelo Rantie leaves the club, transferring to Bournemouth.

Players

Squad

Squad stats

Players in/out

In

Out

Disciplinary record

Club

Coaching staff

Other information

Competitions

Overall

Allsvenskan

League table

Results summary

Results by round

Matches
Kickoff times are in UTC+2 unless stated otherwise.

Svenska Cupen

2012–13
The tournament continued from the 2012 season.

Kickoff times are in UTC+2.

Group stage

2013–14
The tournament continued into the 2014 season.

Qualification stage

Svenska Supercupen

UEFA Europa League

Kickoff times are in UTC+2 unless stated otherwise.

Qualifying phase and play-off round

First qualifying round

Second qualifying round

Third qualifying round

Non competitive

Pre-season
Kickoff times are in UTC+1 unless stated otherwise.

Mid-season
Kickoff times are in UTC+2 unless stated otherwise.

Footnotes

2013
Malmo
Swedish football championship-winning seasons